The Baojun RC-5 is a compact car produced by SAIC-GM-Wuling through the Baojun brand. The RC-5 replaces the 630 sedan introduced in 2011.

Overview

The RC-5 is a part of the 'New Baojun' sub-category and features the Interstellar Geometry design language of the brand. Available in sedan and station wagon (RC-5W) bodystyles, it shares the platform with the RS-5 SUV.

Launched in August 2020, local prices of the Baojun RC-5 models start from RMB59,800 (approximately $8,600 at the rates at the time) for the Baojun RC-5 liftback sedan which is exactly the same as the 630 compact sedan it replaces and RMB72,800 ($10,490) for the RC-5W wagon. The RC-5W also features a roof rack, reclining second row seats with airplane-like headrests and extra headroom compared to the RC-5 liftback sedan.

In June 2021, the wagon version was updated and relaunched as the Baojun Valli. The Valli nameplate of its name stands for the Goddess consort of the Hindu God Murugan.

Specifications
The engine lineup of the Baojun RC-5 includes two inline-four petrol engines with one being a  naturally aspirated 1.5-litre engine and the other one being a  turbocharged 1.5-litre engine. A six-speed manual gearbox and virtual eight-speed continuously variable transmission (CVT) is offered.

Both RC-5 models feature functions normally found in more premium vehicles according to Baojun, including dynamic turn signals, Baojun’s next-generation infotainment system with voice control, wireless cellphone charging, powered seats with memory, and an intelligent air purification system. For safety features, the RC-5 and RC-5W is equipped with 17 advanced driver-assistance system (ADAS) functions.

Baojun RC-5

Baojun RC-5W

Baojun Valli

References 

RC-5
Front-wheel-drive vehicles
Cars of China
Cars introduced in 2020
Vehicles with CVT transmission